Neumania is a genus of mites belonging to the family Unionicolidae.

The genus has cosmopolitan distribution.

Species:
 Neumania aequalis Viets 
 Neumania agilis Koenike, 1916

References

Trombidiformes
Trombidiformes genera